Mohamed Akel (born October 25, 1993) is an Israeli footballer currently playing for Ihud Bnei Kafr Qara.

He made his debut for the senior side in a league game against Bnei Yehuda.

References

External links
 

1993 births
Living people
Israeli footballers
Maccabi Netanya F.C. players
Maccabi Daliyat al-Karmel F.C. players
F.C. Givat Olga players
Hapoel Hadera F.C. players
Hapoel Bnei Ar'ara 'Ara F.C. players
Hapoel Umm al-Fahm F.C. players
Hapoel Bnei Fureidis F.C. players
Ihud Bnei Kafr Qara F.C. players
Israeli Premier League players
Association football forwards
Footballers from Ar'ara